Frycowa  is a village in the administrative district of Gmina Nawojowa within Nowy Sącz County, Lesser Poland Voivodeship in southern Poland.

References

Frycowa